A consultative referendum on home rule was held in Greenland on 17 January 1979. Just over 70% of voters voted in favour of greater autonomy from Denmark, leading to the establishment of a Greenlandic Parliament and Greenland gaining sovereignty in areas such as education, health, fisheries and the environment.

As a result of the referendum, home rule came into effect 1 May 1979 and Greenland became an autonomous constituent country of the Kingdom of Denmark.

Results

See also
Danish Realm

References

1979 referendums
1979
1979 in Greenland
1979 in international relations
Autonomy referendums
January 1979 events in North America